The King's Jutlandic Regiment of Foot was a Royal Danish Army infantry regiment. On 1 November 1991, it was merged with the Funen Life Regiment, into Schleswig Regiment of Foot.

History
The King's Jutlandic Regiment of Foot brings in both the history's (and name's) from the two regiments Jutlandic Regiment of Foot and King's Regiment of Foot

Organisation
 1st battalion (I/KJFR), Founded 1961, Disband 1990. Mechanized Infantry Battalion
  Staff Company
  1st Armored Infantry Company
  2nd Armored Infantry Company
  4th Motorised Infantry Company
 2nd battalion (II/KJFR), Founded 1961, Disband 1990. Infantry Battalion.
  Staff Company
  1st Motorised Infantry Company
  2nd Motorised Infantry Company
  3rd Motorised Infantry Company (same shield with color Blue/White at the top bar)
 3rd battalion (III/KJFR), Founded 1961, Disband 1990. Infantry Battalion.
  Staff Company
  1st Motorised Infantry Company
  2nd Motorised Infantry Company
  3rd Motorised Infantry Company  
  1st Brigade Staff Company/1st Jutland Brigade, Founded 1961, Transferred to Signal Regiment in 1991

Names of the regiment

References
 Lærebog for Hærens Menige, Hærkommandoen, marts 1960
 http://www.kongensjyskefodregiment.dk/

Danish Army regiments
Military units and formations disestablished in 1961